Premier Inn is a British limited service hotel chain and the UK's largest hotel brand, with more than 72,000 rooms and 800 hotels. It operates hotels in a variety of locations including city centres, suburbs and airports competing with the likes of Travelodge and Ibis hotels.

The company was established by Whitbread as Travel Inn in 1987, to compete with Travelodge. Whitbread bought Premier Lodge in 2004 and merged it with Travel Inn to form the current business under the name "Premier Travel Inn", which was then shortened to "Premier Inn" in 2007. Premier Inn accounts for 70% of Whitbread's earnings.

History
The chain started trading in 1987 as Travel Inn. The first site to open was next to "The Watermill" Beefeater restaurant in Basildon.

In 2004, Whitbread acquired another hotel chain, Premier Lodge, for £536 million. This added 141 hotels to the portfolio. Whitbread renamed every hotel "Premier Travel Inn".

In 2005, Premier Travel Inn opened its 500th hotel in Hemel Hempstead.

In early 2006, Premier Travel Inn purchased 11 Holiday Inn hotels in England and Wales. These sites kept their leisure facilities such as a swimming pool and gym, except the hotel situated at Norman Cross. Premier Travel Inn started to launch a new bedroom design during this year to move away from the differences of "Travel Inn" and "Premier Lodge". Until then rooms had remained as they had been before and new hotels were designed as "Travel Inns".

Whitbread shortened the name to "Premier Inn" in 2007; by 2009 the business accounted for more than 70% of Whitbread's earnings.

In September 2007, Whitbread announced the purchase of Golden Tulip UK including six hotels trading in the UK under the Tulip Inn and Golden Tulip brands. The hotels were converted to Premier Inns.

In April 2008, Whitbread announced a £100 million expansion of Premier Inn in London over the following three years.

In July 2008, Whitbread bought 21 Express by Holiday Inn hotels from Mitchells and Butlers in exchange for 44 Beefeater & Brewers Fayre restaurants where it was not possible to build a Premier Inn.

In 2011, the 600th hotel was opened in Stratford-upon-Avon. Premier Inn have sold off some of their smaller hotels (which had fewer than 30 rooms) to Good Night Inns. Most of these were Premier Lodge sites in less prominent locations.

In July 2015, the 700th Premier Inn was opened in Kingston-upon-Thames, London. The company plans to operate 85,000 bedrooms in the UK by 2020.

Locations

United Kingdom

The Premier Inn chain can be found from Thurso in the north of Scotland to Helston, Cornwall in south-west England. Hotels are found either in city centres or on the outskirts near to major A roads and motorways. In October 2010, the Premier Inn hotels located at Roadchef and Moto motorway service stations were sold to Days Inn after the franchise agreement was terminated. Hotels vary in size, with many smaller inns and large purpose-built city centre hotels.

Most Premier Inn hotels are newly built, although many of the chain's inner city locations in the UK are housed within redeveloped office buildings which would otherwise have been demolished. Some hotels such as "Bristol Airport" in Sidcot are housed in older buildings.

In the wake of the Grenfell Tower fire, Premier Inn said three of their hotels in Maidenhead, Brentford and Tottenham were built with cladding. All three were tested and found to comply with building fire standards. None of them had the same type as Grenfell Tower.

Ireland

In 2007, Premier Inn entered Ireland, when it took over the Tulip Inn in Swords. Premier Inn offer bus transfers to and from Dublin Airport, which is nearby. As of 2019, Premier Inn is currently pursuing an expansion in Dublin and has bought four sites in the city centre and Docklands area including at Aungiers Street, Castleforbes Business Park, Gloucester Street South and Jervis Street.

United Arab Emirates
In 2006, Premier Inn announced that it had entered into a joint venture agreement with Emirates Group to launch in the Gulf Cooperation Council region. This was the first move to expand the brand beyond the UK. The joint venture identified three sites in Dubai, creating more than 800 new rooms. The first Premier Inn in Dubai to open was a 300-room hotel at Dubai Investment Park. A similar size hotel at Dubai Airport, and a 220-room hotel at Dubai Silicon Oasis on Emirates Road, were opened. Dubai Ibn Battuta Mall Hotel has also been opened, connected to Ibn Battuta Mall. There is also a Premier Inn located in the Abu Dhabi Capital Centre, and another Premier Inn located in Abu Dhabi International Airport which opened on 19 November 2013.

Premier Inn operate a total of 7 hotels in Dubai, and 2 hotels in Abu Dhabi.

Qatar 
Premier Inn has two locations in Qatar. One in Education City, next to Qatar National Convention Centre (QNCC), which opened in May 2017. This hotel also has a swimming pool and gym. Premier Inn opened their second hotel in January 2020 near Hamad International Airport, which is also located in the close vicinity of Souq Waqif, National Museum of Qatar and Museum of Islamic Art, Doha. Within three years Premier Inn brand has established itself as the leading midmarket hotel brand in Qatar with high guest review ratings on hotel rating forums such as Google, Booking.com and Tripadvisor.

Germany
In 2016, Premier Inn launched its first hotel in the German market – Frankfurt Messe. As of July 2021, it has grown to 28 hotels across the principal German cities, partly through the acquisition of Ninety Nine, Four Side, Centro and Boutique 009 hotels.

Formats
As well as the standard Premier Inns, which are limited service hotels, there are two sub-brands. Hub by Premier Inn is a city-centre format with smaller rooms but in-room technology such as tablets. Zip by Premier Inn is lower-priced and has smaller pod-like rooms. Some rooms do not have windows and there is a simplified food and drink service. The first Zip hotel was opened in Roath, Cardiff in 2019.

Restaurants
All Premier Inns have an on-site restaurant, with the exception of hotels which were formerly Holiday Inn Express, where kitchen facilities were added to the hotel for breakfasts only. Most hotels are accompanied by a Whitbread restaurant such as Whitbread Inns, Table Table, Brewers Fayre or Beefeater. The majority of town and city centre hotels have an in-house restaurant called Thyme. City centre hotels used to have a Slice or BarEst restaurant, whose design and menus were very similar. Hotels that used to be Premier Lodges have a range of different restaurants, operated by Spirit Pub Company such as Chef & Brewer or Fayre & Square. Former Express by Holiday Inn sites have a Mitchells & Butlers restaurant, either Harvester, Toby Carvery or Vintage Inns. Some hotels have a third-party restaurant that used to be owned by Whitbread, such as TGI Friday's. Newer inner city Premier Inns which have been built in smaller spaces have a restaurant called The Kitchen.

Advertising
Premier Inn was the first major budget hotel chain in the UK to invest in prime time television advertising. After Travel Inn and Premier Lodge merged, animated adverts were used to advertise the merger. In late 2007, comedian Lenny Henry became the face of the campaign and is now in every advert.

In May 2011, the BBC's consumer television programme Watchdog criticised its widely advertised £29 promotion, having received complaints from viewers that it was almost impossible to book for that price because very few promotional rooms were available. Premier Inn stated that this was due to its rooms being "popular".

Online and digital promotion now drive a significant proportion of bookings made for the brand. Premier Inn have made substantial investments in both its main website and mobile app for smartphone bookings, and these are further complemented by affiliate marketing, whereby third party websites drive bookings onto the Premier Inn website.

See also
Helmont House
North Tower (Salford)

References

External links

 

Hotel chains in the United Kingdom
Hotels established in 1987
Companies based in Bedfordshire
Whitbread divisions and subsidiaries
British brands
British companies established in 1987